Konstantin Alekseyevich Tereschenko (born 17 June 1994) is a Russian professional racing driver who currently competes in the European Le Mans Series with Duqueine Engineering.

Career

Karting
Born in Moscow, Tereshchenko began karting in 2009 in the Junior class of the German karting championship. For the next two years he competed in the KF2 category, racing in various European karting championships.

Formula Renault
In 2012, Tereshchenko moved into open-wheel racing, competing in Formula Renault 2.0 Alps with the Interwetten.com Racing Team. He ended the season 32nd, without scoring a point. He also had a part-time campaign in Eurocup Formula Renault 2.0.

Tereshchenko stayed with the team for the 2013 Formula Renault 2.0 Alps season. He improved to fifteenth position in the final series standings with four point-scoring positions. He also competed in three rounds of the Eurocup Formula Renault 2.0.

Euroformula Open
Tereshchenko stepped up to the Euroformula Open Championship, with Campos Racing, in 2014.  He will remain with Campos Racing for a second season in 2015.

GP3 Series
In 2014, Tereshchenko was to have made his debut in the GP3 Series with Trident. He suffered a spectacular rollover in his first free practice session at Spa and was unable to partake in both races.

World Series
Tereshchenko made his debut with Spain's Teo Martín Motorsport at the opening round of the World Series Formula V8 3.5 in 2017, where he is currently 8th in the championship, with a best result of 3rd.

Racing record

Career summary

* Season still in progress.

Complete GP3 Series results
(key) (Races in bold indicate pole position) (Races in italics indicate fastest lap)

Complete World Series Formula V8 3.5 results
(key) (Races in bold indicate pole position; races in italics indicate fastest lap)

Complete European Le Mans Series results

‡ Half points awarded as less than 75% of race distance was completed.

24 Hours of Le Mans results

Complete GT World Challenge Europe Sprint Cup results
(key) (Races in bold indicate pole position) (Races in italics indicate fastest lap)

References

External links

Russian racing drivers
Sportspeople from Moscow
1994 births
Living people
Formula Renault Eurocup drivers
Euroformula Open Championship drivers
Formula Renault 2.0 Alps drivers
Russian GP3 Series drivers
German Formula Three Championship drivers
Russian people of Ukrainian descent
Konstantin
24 Hours of Le Mans drivers
European Le Mans Series drivers
AV Formula drivers
SMP Racing drivers
Teo Martín Motorsport drivers
Campos Racing drivers
Trident Racing drivers
EPIC Racing drivers